Deux was a South Korean K-pop duo from the early 1990s, who were among the first to incorporate hip hop into Korean music.

History 
Deux members Lee Hyun Do and Kim Sung-jae met when they worked as back-up dancers for Korean rapper Hyun Jin-young. They debuted in 1993 with the album, Deux, which featured the hit song, "Turn Around and Look at Me." In addition to helping introduce hip hop and new jack swing to Korea, the duo is also notable for popularizing hip hop-influenced choreography and fashion. After releasing three more albums, they broke up in 1995 to pursue solo careers.

Only one day after his solo debut, Kim Sung-jae was found dead of an apparent drug overdose. Investigators later found traces of animal anesthesia in his body, and determined that his girlfriend had recently purchased anesthesia. However, there was insufficient evidence to continue the investigation, and the exact circumstances of his death remain unsolved.

After Sung-Jae's death, Lee Hyun Do released the greatest hits album, Deux Forever. He went on to work as a producer and composer for popular K-pop artists and has appeared on TV shows YG Win and Show Me The Money.

Discography

Albums 
 Deux (April 23, 1993)
 Deuxism (December 1993)
 Rhythm Light Beat Black (1994)
 Force Deux (April 1995)
 Live 199507121617 (April 1995)
 Deux Forever (1996)

Awards

no.1 on music chart shows

Notes

References 

https://rateyourmusic.com/artist/deux_f1

South Korean hip hop groups
K-pop music groups
Hip hop duos
Musical groups disestablished in 1995
South Korean boy bands